"Mitt hjerte alltid vanker" ("My Heart Always Wanders") is an old Scandinavian Christmas song, released as a single with Norwegian singer Sissel in 1995. It is one of several versions of the originally Danish hymn, which has since been translated and set to different melodies in the different Scandinavian countries. Kyrkjebø sings a Norwegian translation set to a Norwegian variant of a Swedish folk melody, which was first written down in 1816 in Västergötland in Sweden. This is the version is the most popular in Norway and Sweden.

Carola Häggkvist recorded the song on her 1999 Christmas album Jul i Betlehem using the same version, as has various other Norwegian and Swedish artists.

The original hymn "Mit hierte altid vancker" was written by Danish bishop and hymn writer Hans Adolph Brorson.  It first came out in print in 1732.

In Denmark, the most popular version of this song is set to the melody composed by Carl Nielsen, with Thomas Laub's correspondence. Nielsen also had assistance with Paul Hellmuth in making the harmonies for the song.

Like the lyrics, Nielsen's melody is meditative and introverted without any drama. It spans only one octave and, for the most part, consists of incremental progressive quarter nodes. The structure of the melody process itself is also quite simple. The first four beats are repeated, after which the melody, in a broken triad, swings up to the highest tune of the melody, so that over the next sixteen beats it moves slowly down to the root in incremental movements. Thus, text and music are both simple, calm and reflective of the story of the gospel.

References

External links
Lyrics for "Mitt hjerte alltid vanker"

Christmas carols
18th-century songs
1995 singles
Sissel Kyrkjebø songs
Carola Häggkvist songs